Gun safety is the study and practice of using, transporting, storing and disposing of firearms and ammunition, including the training of gun users, the design of weapons, and formal and informal regulation of gun production, distribution, and usage, for the purpose of avoiding unintentional injury, illness, or death. This includes mishaps like accidental discharge, negligent discharge, and firearm malfunctions, as well as secondary risks like hearing loss, lead poisoning from bullets, and pollution from other hazardous materials in propellants and cartridges. There were 47,000 unintentional firearm deaths worldwide in 2013.

History

Accidental explosions of stored gunpowder date to  the 13th century in Yangzhou, China. Early handheld muskets using matchlock or wheel lock mechanisms were limited by poor reliability and the risk of accidental discharge, which was improved somewhat by the introduction of the flintlock, though unintentional firing continued to be a serious drawback. Percussion caps, introduced in the 1820s, were more reliable, and by 1830 inventors added security pins to their designs to prevent accidental discharges. Trigger guards and grip safetys were further steps leading to the various safeties built into modern firearms.

Malfunctions

Storage

Proper storage prevents unauthorized use or theft of firearms and ammunition, or damage to them. A gun safe or gun cabinet is commonly used to physically prevent access to a firearm. Local laws may require particular standards for the lock, for the strength and burglar resistance of the cabinet, and may even require weapons and ammunition to be stored separately. Rifles or shotgun  safes that are a lighter version of true safes are generally the norm for hunters or multiple firearm owners. Various safety standards like the RSC standard and CDOJ safety standard in US exists for the minimum requirement to qualify a container as firearm safety storage device.  Similarly small handgun safes of different sizes and capacity are preferred for storing small number of handguns although most of them are found to be not very reliable by independent researchers and professional hackers. Locking mechanism plays important role in overall safety of the small safe. Generally simplex mechanical locks are found to be most secure and reliable.

For ammunition some experts recommend storing in secure locations away from firearms. Ammunition should be kept in cool, dry conditions free from contaminating vapors to prevent deterioration of the propellant and cartridge. Handloaders must take special precautions for storing primers and loose gunpowder.

Training, habits and mindset 

Gun safety training teaches a safety mindset, habits, and rules. The mindset is that firearms are inherently dangerous and must always be stored carefully and handled with care. Handlers are taught to treat firearms with respect for their destructive capabilities, and strongly discouraged from playing or toying with firearms, a common cause of accidents. The rules of gun safety follow from this mindset.

In 1902, the English politician and game shooting enthusiast Mark Hanbury Beaufoy wrote some much-quoted verses on gun safety, meant to instill the safety mindset.  Various similar sayings have since been popularized. Jeff Cooper, an influential figure in modern firearms training, formalized and popularized "Four Rules" of safe firearm handling. Prior lists of gun safety rules included as few as three basic safety rules or as many as ten rules including gun safety and sporting etiquette rules. In addition to Cooper, other influential teachers of gun safety include Massad Ayoob, Clint Smith, Chuck Taylor, Jim Crews, Bob Munden and Ignatius Piazza. Organisations such as The National Rifle Association of America provide similar sets of rules.

Disassembly

Locks

There are several types of locks that serve to make it difficult to discharge a firearm. Locks are considered less effective than keeping firearms stored in a lockable safe since locks are more easily defeated than approved safes. An unauthorized handler can bypass the locked firearm at their leisure.  Some manufacturers, such as Taurus, build locks into the firearm itself.

California effected regulations in 2000 that forced locks to be approved by a firearm safety device laboratory via California Penal Code Section 12088.  All locks under this code must receive extensive tests including saw, pick, pull, and many other tests in order to be approved for the state of California. If a lock passes the requirements then it is said to be California Department of Justice (CADOJ) approved.

Trigger lock
Trigger locks prevent trigger manipulation, however they do not guarantee that the firearm absolutely cannot be discharged (see above). Some trigger locks are integrated into the design of the weapon, requiring no external parts besides the key. Generally, two pieces come together from either side behind the trigger and are locked in place, which can be unlocked with a key or combination. This physically prevents the trigger from being depressed to discharge the weapon. They may also form part of a larger padlock which locks the entire action. Other more commercially common types of trigger locks do not go behind the trigger, but encompass the full area within the trigger guard to making the trigger inaccessible to users. Advanced models may also feature anti-tamper alarms. A common critique of trigger locks is the time taken to unlock them, limiting their usefulness in a self-defense scenario. One potential solution to this is the use of biometric locks which can be removed by the owner near-instantaneously.

There is controversy surrounding manufacturing standards, usage, and legislation of trigger locks. While supporters of trigger locks argue that they will save children by preventing accidents, critics point to demonstrations that some models can be removed by children with very little force and common household tools. Many firearms can discharge when dropped. Firearms that fully disengage the hammer when the safety is on pose less of a risk. Trigger locks are not designed for use on loaded firearms as the locking mechanism itself may be able manipulate the trigger if pressure is exerted on the lock or during installation/removal; critics argue that this may make the firearm more dangerous by creating the illusion of safety. A former senior product manager at Master Lock, a trigger lock manufacturer, was quoted as saying "If it is a loaded gun, there isn't a lock out there that will keep it from being fired... If you put a trigger lock on any loaded gun, you are making the gun more dangerous." Critics also point out that a trigger lock will increase the time it takes an owner to respond to a self-defense emergency. In 2008, the U.S. Supreme Court overturned a Washington, D.C. law that required handguns to be locked or otherwise kept inoperative within the home, saying that this "makes it impossible for citizens to use them for the core lawful purpose of self-defense".

Although there are no universal standards for the design or testing of trigger locks, some jurisdictions, such as the state of California, maintain a list of approved trigger lock devices. In Canada, a trigger lock is one of the methods prescribed by law to secure a firearm during transport or storage.

Chamber locks

Chamber locks aim to block ammunition from being chambered, since most firearms typically cannot be discharged unless the ammunition is in the correct position. They are used to prevent live ammunition from being loaded into a firearm by blocking the chamber with a dummy cartridge or a chamber plug, which is sometimes wedged into place with the use of a tool, in essence jamming the firearm.  Another type is one in which a steel rod locked into the safety cartridge with a key.  As long as the rod and safety cartridge are engaged, the dummy round cannot eject nor can live ammunition be loaded into the firearm.  Chamber locks work with most firearm types including revolvers, pistols, rifles and shotguns.  They are available in any caliber and length, and may include such features as unique keying, rapid removal, and rigorous testing and certification by major state departments such as the California Department of Justice.

Some shooting ranges require the handler to insert a temporary chamber plug which often has a brightly colored external tag, to signal the chamber being devoid of ammunition and blocked, whenever the firearm is being unused.  These are called empty chamber indicators, or chamber flags.

Cable locks
Cable locks are a popular type of lock that usually threads into the receiver through the ejection port of repeating firearms.  These locks physically obstruct the movements of the bolt, thereby preventing the cycling of the action, and deny the return to "battery" and the closure of the breech.  In many designs of pistol and rifle, they also thread through the magazine well of the firearm to prevent the proper insertion of a magazine.

Smart gun
Personalized firearms, or smart guns, are intended to prevent unauthorized use with built-in locks that are released by RFID chips or other proximity devices, fingerprint recognition, magnetic rings, or a microchip implant.

"A Rule for Shooting"

Secondary dangers

While a firearm's primary danger lies in the discharge of ammunition, there are other ways a firearm may be detrimental to the health of the handler and bystanders.

Noise
When a firearm is discharged it emits a very loud noise, typically close to the handler's ears. This can cause temporary or permanent hearing damage such as tinnitus. Hearing protection such as earplugs, or earmuffs, or both,  can reduce the risk of hearing damage. Some earmuffs or headphones made for shooting and similar loud situations use active noise control. Firearms may also have silencers which reduce the sound intensity from the barrel.

Hot gases and debris
A firearm emits hot gases, powder, and other debris when discharged. Some firearms, such as semi-automatic and fully automatic firearms, typically eject spent cartridge casings at high speed. Casings are also dangerously hot when ejected. Revolvers store spent casings in the chamber, but may emit a stream of hot gases and possible fine particulate debris laterally from the interface between the revolving chamber and the barrel. Any of these may hurt the handler or bystanders through burning or impact damage. Because eyes are particularly vulnerable to this type of damage, eye protection should be worn to reduce the risk of injury. Prescription lenses and various tints to suit different light conditions are available. Some eye protection products are rated to withstand impact from birdshot loads, which offers protection against irresponsible firearms use by other game bird shooters.

Toxins and pollutants
In recent years the toxic effects of ammunition and firearm cleaning agents have been highlighted.

Lead ammunition left in nature may become mobilized by acid rain.
Older ammunition may have mercury-based primers.
Lead accumulates in shooting range backstops.

Indoor ranges require good ventilation to remove pollutants such as powder, smoke, and lead dust from the air around the shooters. Indoor and outdoor ranges typically require extensive decontamination when they are decommissioned to remove all traces of lead, copper, and powder residues from the area.

Lead, copper and other metals will also be released when a firearm is cleaned. Highly aggressive solvents and other agents used to remove lead and powder fouling may also present a hazard to health. Installing good ventilation, washing hands after handling firearms, and cleaning the space where the firearm was handled lessens the risk of unnecessary exposure.

Unsafe users

Impaired users
Firearms should never be handled by persons who are under the influence of alcohol or any drugs which may affect their judgment. Gun safety teachers advocate zero tolerance of their use. In the United States, this recommendation is codified in many states' penal codes as a crime of "carrying under the influence", with penalties similar to DWI/DUI. Other sources of temporary impairment include exhaustion, dehydration, and emotional stress. These can affect reaction time, cognitive processing, sensory perception, and judgment.

Many jurisdictions prohibit the possession of firearms by people deemed generally incapable of using them safely, such as the mentally ill or convicted felons.

Children 

The National Rifle Association of America's Eddie Eagle program for preschoolers through 6th graders is intended to teach children to avoid firearm accidents when they encounter guns that have not been securely stored out of their reach.

Whether programs like Eddie Eagle are effective has not been conclusively determined. Some studies published in peer-reviewed journals have shown that it is very difficult for young children to control their curiosity even when they have been taught not to touch firearms. Gun access is also a major risk factor for youth suicide. The American Academy of Pediatrics (AAP) advises that keeping a gun in the home, especially a handgun, increases the risk of injury and death for children and youth in the home.

See also 
 Safety area

References

External links 

 A Review of Gun Safety Technologies—National Institute of Justice

 
Firearm training
Safety practices